Free-range parenting is the concept of raising children in the spirit of encouraging them to function independently and with limited parental supervision, in accordance with their age of development and with a reasonable acceptance of realistic personal risks. It is seen as the opposite of helicopter parenting. A notable text of the movement is Lenore Skenazy's book Free-Range Kids: Giving Our Children the Freedom We Had Without Going Nuts with Worry (2009).

Overview 
 
Hoping to enhance psychoanalysis in the pediatric world, Benjamin Spock authored a book called The Common Sense Book of Baby and Child Care.  The book, which was released in 1946 and soon became a best seller, encouraged free-range parenting with the hopes of implementing Freudian philosophy into child-rearing. American journalist Lenore Skenazy has written about the problems of overparenting and overprotection of kids with a particular emphasis on allowing kids to have appropriate levels of freedom and responsibility for their age while still keeping them safe.  Her book, Free Range Kids: Giving Our Children the Freedom We Had without Going Nuts with Worry and her related website (April 2008) describe what she sees as the horrors of mainstream schooling, parenting, and organised activities, highlighting the unnecessary protection from risk that limits children's opportunity to mature properly into independent adults, and the unnecessary training, even in using flash cards for preschoolers, thereby limiting their opportunities for personal growth.

Legal status in the United States

Restrictions
In the United States, free-range parenting is limited by laws in many states restricting children's autonomy, such as how old a child must be to walk to school alone. In Massachusetts, such issues are generally addressed on a case-by-case basis. Other states, such as Delaware, or Colorado, based on states' child labor laws, will investigate reports of any child under the age of 12 being left alone, whereas other states, like North Carolina, have firm laws that stipulate a child under 8 should not be left home alone. Only three states specify a minimum age for leaving a child home alone. These include Illinois which requires children to be 14 years old, in Maryland, the minimum age is 8, and in Oregon 10. The perception of what constitutes neglect varies a lot depending on the State Law in place, the age of the children and if an injury occurred or not.

In 2014 and 2015, parents in Maryland were investigated by their local Child Protective Services when their children walked home from a park unsupervised.

In December 2015, however, new federal law contained an amendment added by Sen. Mike Lee stating that:

...nothing in this Act shall...prohibit a child from traveling to and from school on foot or by car, bus, or bike when the parents of the child have given permission; or  expose parents to civil or criminal charges for allowing their child to responsibly and safely travel to and from school by a means the parents believe is age appropriate.

A caveat adds, "...nothing in this section 10 shall be construed to preempt State or local laws."

Legal protections
In 2018, Utah became the first state to enact legislation which explicitly protected parents' right to "free range" their children. This was followed by Oklahoma and Texas.

Legal status in Canada 
There is no legal consensus about when parents can leave their children unsupervised in Canada.  However, according to section 218 of the Criminal Code of Canada, a person who "unlawfully abandons or exposes a child who is under the age of ten years, so that its life is or is likely to be endangered or its health is or is likely to be permanently injured" commits a criminal offence. Each province is responsible for its legal framework. Red Cross Canada is offering a training course for children between the age of 9 and 13 (Stay Safe!) to improve their capacity to respond to an emergency case if they stay home alone, suggesting that parents use their own discretion when it comes to their own individual children. The Red Cross babysitting course targets the 11 to 15 years old, suggesting at this age children are able to supervise younger children effectively and safely.

In Ontario, the law is very vague concerning the age at which children might be left alone. Parents are responsible for their children until they are 16 years old but it does not mean that they should be under constant parental supervision. While a staying home age is not specified, parents are not permitted to leave their children unattended in vehicles.

See also 
Children's street culture
 Free range in animal farming
Home zone/Play street
 Latchkey kid
 Meitiv incidents
 Sudbury School
 Unschooling

References

External links 
 Free-range kids, website of author Lenore Skenazy
 Neglect or Nurture? The Value of 'Free-Range' Parenting & Childhood Freedom, The Takeaway 4/2015
 The Case for Free-Range Parenting, NYTimes, 3/2015

Parenting